In mathematics, and especially general topology, the Euclidean topology is the natural topology induced on -dimensional Euclidean space  by the Euclidean metric.

Definition

In any metric space, the open balls form a base for a topology on that space. 

Properties

When endowed with this topology, the real line  is a T5 space. 

See also

References

Topology